Tahuamanu Province is the smallest of three provinces in the Madre de Dios Region of Peru.

Political division
The province is divided into three districts, which are:
 Iberia
 Iñapari
 Tahuamanu

Provinces of the Madre de Dios Region